Quarante is a commune in the Hérault department in the Occitanie region in southern France. Quarante is a hilltop medieval village from the Gallo-Roman era, just 1km from the famous 17th century Canal du Midi, 8km from Capestang, 25km from Béziers, and 35km from the Mediterranean Sea. The closest train station and regional airport is in Béziers, and 59km to the north is the city of Carcassonne, famous for its medieval walled citadel. International airports within an hour are; Carcassonne, Perpignan, Montpellier, and with Toulouse being two hours away.

Installed on a Roman oppidum, the town had a significant occupation during those times, as evidenced by the artifacts found and available for viewing in the local museum. The Sainte-Marie de Quarante Abbey, built in 902, is located in the town square. You can still see the original rempart walls, towers and prison in the ancient town center on the stone roads from the 12th and 13th centuries on Rue des Remparts and Rue des Bichettes. Quarante has had a relatively peaceful history over the centuries, mainly focused on wine and olive production which is still relevant today. Quiet, with very light tourism, the village seduces by its proximity to some of the most beautiful cities of the region, but also by its natural and preserved environment. This area boasts over 300 days of sunshine a year, perfect for the local vineyards and olive groves. The village has a middle school, bakery, butcher, grocery, pizza take-out, bar and restaurant, wine tasting, hair salon, B&B, pharmacy and post office.

Population

See also
Communes of the Hérault department

References

Communes of Hérault